Reedy Creek is a  long 2nd order tributary to Crabtree Creek in Wake County, North Carolina.

Course
Reedy Creek rises near the WPTF radio towers then flows north into William B. Umstead State Park where it meets Crabtree Creek. The watershed is about 50% forested.

Watershed
Reedy Creek drains  of area and is underlaid by the Raleigh terrane geologic formation.  The watershed receives an average of 46.1 in/year of precipitation and has a wetness index of 386.39.

See also
List of rivers of North Carolina

External links
 William B. Umstead State Park

References

Rivers of North Carolina
Rivers of Wake County, North Carolina
Tributaries of Pamlico Sound